Obregón or Obregon is a Spanish surname. It originates from the village of Obregón in modern-day Cantabria, Spain.

Notable people with the surname include:

 Alejandro Obregón (1920-1992), Colombian painter, muralist, sculptor and engraver
 Alfonso Obregón (born 1972), former Ecuadorian football player
 Álvaro Obregón Salido (1880-1928), President of Mexico from 1920 to 1924
 Álvaro Obregón Tapia (1916-1993), Governor of Sonora, Mexico (1955–1961), son of president Álvaro Obregón Salido
 Ana Obregón (born 1955), Spanish actress, celebrity and socialite
 Edgardo “Gato” Obregón (born 1999), Mexican football prodigy
 Eugene A. Obregon (1930-1950), United States Marine, posthumously awarded the Medal of Honor
 Josetxu Obregón, Spanish cellist

See also
Obregon (disambiguation)

References

Spanish toponymic surnames